Clara Galiani Tiezzi Dias Vaz (Brasília, 14 June 1999) is a Brazilian actress. She is known for being the protagonist of the children's series Teca na TV and for her prominent role as Mabi in the telenovela Ti Ti Ti; the latter secured her five awards in six categories, voted winner overall. In 2018, she was cast in the Nickelodeon Latin America series Noobees, the first Tiezzi's international work, whose character was also voiced by her for airing in Brazil.

Career 
Daughter of lawyers Vanessa Tiezzi and Carlos Otávio Dias Vaz, she began her career at the age of four in the theater, after transferring with her family from Brasília to Niterói. Debuted on television in 2007, starring as Teca in the children's series Teca na TV, which was aired on Canal Futura. At the end of the same year, she participated in the Rede Globo year-end special O Segredo da Princesa Lili as Irvana. In 2009, she made a cameo appearance in Malhação.

In 2010, she was cast in Ti Ti Ti as Mabi, whose character was inspired by American blogger Tavi Gevinson, teen fashion icon. Her performance in the plot resulted in several awards: Among them, highlighted in the Brazil Art Quality Award and Contigo TV Award, for the category of 'Best child/Juvenile actress' and 'Best child Actor or Actress', respectively Two years later, she was cast at Rede Record to portray the character Mariana in the telenovela Rebelde. In 2013, she returned to Rede Globo on the 21st season of Malhação, portraying the character Clara.

Also in 2013, she debuted as film actress in Confissões de Adolescente as Karina, a girl who shifts style after the beginning of the relationship. The film is based on the book of same name by Maria Mariana which was also adapted into a play and television series in the 1990s. Two years later, she was back in a film in É Fada!.

In 2018, working in Colombia in Spanish, she debuted in her first international work in television in the Nickelodeon Latin America series Noobees, playing the role Laura Calles; a character who was also dubbed by herself in Portuguese to be shown in Brazil.

Filmography

Television

Film

Awards and nominations

References 

Brazilian film actresses
Brazilian television actresses
Brazilian child actors
1999 births
Living people